Unstone is a civil parish in the North East Derbyshire district of Derbyshire, England.  The parish contains 15 listed buildings that are recorded in the National Heritage List for England.  Of these, two are listed at Grade II*, the middle of the three grades, and the others are at Grade II, the lowest grade.  The parish contains the villages of Unstone, Apperknowle and West Handley and smaller settlements, and is otherwise rural.  Apart from a railway viaduct, all the listed buildings are houses, cottages and associated structures, farmhouses, and farm buildings.


Key

Buildings

References

Citations

Sources

 

Lists of listed buildings in Derbyshire